Edward Hall (1498–1547) was an English chronicler and lawyer.

Edward, Ed, Edd, or Eddie Hall may also refer to:

People
Edward Smith Hall (1786–1860), English-born convict, newspaper editor & entrepreneur in Australia
J. Edward Hall (1851–1889), American socialist politician and trade union organizer
Sir Edward Marshall Hall (1858–1927), English barrister
Edward K. Hall (1870–1932), American football coach and head of the football rules committee, 1911–1932
Edward L. Hall (1872–1932), American tennis player
Edward Ramsden Hall (1900–1982), British racing driver and Olympic bobsledder
Edward N. Hall (1914–2006), American rocket scientist
Edward T. Hall (1914–2009), American anthropologist
Edward Thomas Hall (1924–2001), English scientist
Edd Hall (born 1958), American television announcer, formerly for The Tonight Show with Jay Leno
Edward J. Hall, American philosopher
Edward Hall (director) (born 1966), English theatre director
Ed Hall (television presenter) (born 1972), British television presenter
Eddie Hall (born 1988), English professional strongman

Arts, entertainment, and media
Ed Hall (band), an American alternative rock band
Ed Hall (One Life to Live), a fictional character from the American soap opera One Life to Live

See also
Edmond Hall (1901–1967), American musician
Edwards Hall, a multipurpose arena in Miami, Florida, U.S.A.
Edwin Hall (disambiguation)
Ted Hall (disambiguation)
Teddy Hall (disambiguation)